Shooting sports at the 1986 Asian Games were held in Seoul, South Korea on September 21–28, 1986.

Medalists

Men

Women

Open

Medal table

References

 ISSF Results Overview
 New Straits Times, September 22–29, 1986
 The Straits Times, September 22–29, 1986

 
1986 Asian Games events
1986
Asian Games
1986 Asian Games